Tsuru (鶴) is the Japanese word for crane. It may refer to:

Tsuru (name), a Japanese name
Tsuru, Yamanashi, a city in Japan
Tsuru University, located in the city
Tsuru Shima, a uninhabited island in Okayama Prefecture, Japan
Nissan Sentra, a car formerly marketed in Mexico as the Tsuru

See also
Tsurui, a village in Hokkaido